Nasir Ahmad el-Rufai  (born 16 February 1960) is a Nigerian politician who has served as governor of Kaduna State since 2015. He was minister of the Federal Capital Territory from 2003 to 2007; and the director of the Bureau of Public Enterprises. He is a founding member of the ruling All Progressives Congress.

Family
Nasir Ahmad El-Rufai was born on 16 February 1960 to a Fulani family in Daudawa. His father died while he was 8 years old, and he was sponsored through his early schooling by an uncle in Kaduna. El-Rufai is married to three wives, his first wife Hadiza Isma El-Rufai is a writer and novelist; she runs the Yasmin El-Rufai Foundation (YELF), set up in honour of their daughter who died in 2011.

Education 
El-Rufai was educated in Barewa College. As a junior at the college, President Umaru Yar'Adua was the house captain of his dormitory. In 1976, he graduated at the top of his class, winning the "Barewa Old Boys' Association Academic Achievement" Trophy. El-Rufai attended Ahmadu Bello University in Zaria, where he received a bachelor's degree in quantity surveying with first class honours.

In 1984, he received a Master of Business Administration from Ahmadu Bello University. He has since attended several professional and post-graduate programs, including the Georgetown School of Foreign Service of Georgetown University in Washington, D.C and programs on privatization and leadership.

In August 2008 he received a law degree from the University of London; and a master's degree in public administration from the John F. Kennedy School of Government of Harvard University in June 2009. He also received the Kennedy School Certificate in Public Policy and Management having spent 11 months as an Edward A. Mason Fellow in Public Policy and Management from July 2008 to June 2009.

Professional career
In 1982, he founded El-Rufai & Partners, a quantity surveying consulting firm with three partners which he managed until 1998. During the military juntas of 1983–1998, the firm received building and civil engineering contracts including during the construction of Abuja, making the partners "young millionaires". In addition to his practice, El-Rufai held management positions with two international telecommunications companies, AT&T Network Systems International BV and Motorola Inc.

Early political career 
In 1998, following the death of military head of state General Sani Abacha, his successor General Abdulsalami Abubakar appointed El-Rufai as an economic advisor. In this role he worked with the World Bank and International Monetary Fund.

In 1999, the military transferred power to President Olusegun Obasanjo. In November 1999, he was appointed the director of the Bureau of Public Enterprises, and secretary of the National Council of Privatisation where he spear-headed the privatisation of several government owned corporations alongside Vice President Atiku Abubakar.

Minister of the Federal Capital Territory 
In July 2003, he was appointed the Minister of the Federal Capital Territory. During his tenure, he presided over a radical transformation of the federal capital earlier riddled with corruption and vast deviation from the original masterplan. With the establishment of the Abuja Geographic Information System, the capital became the first municipality in Nigeria with a computerised land register and information system.

Along with the President and members of the Economic Management Team, he led the reform of the Nigerian public service which had become dysfunctional during years of military dictatorship. At various times during his tenure as Minister, he oversaw the Federal Ministries of Commerce (twice) and Interior. He also chaired several high-profile cabinet committees that led to the establishment of a mortgage system in Nigeria, National ID card system for Nigeria, Electric Power Supply Improvement and the sale of Federal Government real estate in Abuja.

During the last days of the Obasanjo administration, Nuhu Ribadu, a one-time El-Rufai ally described him as the "de facto No. 2 official", tagging him with the role of Vice President, especially after the fall-out between Obasanjo and his vice president Atiku Abubakar. It is believed that Obasanjo's trust and confidence in El-Rufai angered a vast majority of the political class, which would later persecute him.

Exile 
In 2008, El-Rufai went into self-imposed exile and became a vocal critic of the Umaru Yar'Adua administration.

Politics 
In 2010, he returned to Nigeria and was subsequently arrested by the Economic and Financial Crimes Commission (EFCC). He explained his return was in order to clear his name of corruption charges. In 2011, el-Rufai joined party politics with the Congress for Progressive Change supporting Muhammadu Buhari's campaign in the 2011 presidential election. In 2013, el-Rufai was appointed deputy national secretary of the newly formed All Progressives Congress (APC).

In 2014, El-Rufai declared his campaign for Governor of Kaduna State, contesting the APC governorship primaries to emerged as the party's candidate for Governor of Kaduna State. He went on to win the governorship election, with over one million votes to defeat the incumbent Governor Mukhtar Ramalan Yero the candidate of the People's Democratic Party. In 2018, he again emerged as the APC's governorship candidate. He was re-elected on 9 March 2019, defeating his closest rival by over 200,000 votes.

Governor of Kaduna State

On 29 May 2015, El-Rufai was sworn in as the 22nd Governor of Kaduna State. In his inaugural address, he declared that he and his deputy were cutting their allowances by half pending an improvement in the state's fiscal situation. On 6 August 2015, El-Rufai in one of his first acts as governor announced that Kaduna State will adopt the Treasury Single Account policy by 1 September of the same year. At the end of the exercise, 470 accounts belonging to different ministries, departments and agencies were closed and a sum of N24.7 billion was recovered and remitted to the Kaduna State Government TSA with the Central Bank of Nigeria.

By blocking leakages and cutting the cost of running government, it is estimated that the El-Rufai administration was able to save N1.2 billion in just two months. El-Rufai also reformed the civil service in Kaduna State and reduced the number of ministries from 19 to 13 and the number of permanent secretaries from 35 to 18. In a bid to reduce the cost of governance, El-Rufai appointed only 13 commissioners, 10 special advisers and 12 special assistants as against the 24 commissioners, 41 special advisers and about 400 special assistants appointed by the previous administration.

As governor, El-Rufai has embarked on a comprehensive education reform with the goal of revamping the moribund state of education. El-Rufai sacked over 22,000 unqualified primary teachers.  El-Rufai's administration launched the School Feeding Programme, aimed at providing one free meal per day to 1.5 million pupils in public primary schools within the state. He also abolished the collection of fees and levies in public primary and junior secondary schools in Kaduna, thereby removing a financial burden of N3 billion from the parents.

On 28 March 2020, El-Rufai tested positive for COVID-19, following contact with an index case. He has placed a curfew in Kaduna State and restricted movement, to prevent the spread of the virus.

On 20 August 2020, Controversy arose on social media when the Nigerian Bar Association invited Governor El-rufai to speak at its annual conference. Thousands of Nigerians signed a petition on change.org to have Governor El-rufai's invitation revoked. The NBA succumbed to the pressure and disinvited the governor. A report by Open Bar initiative cited eight reasons why El-rufai's invitation to the general conference was turned down. 
 Some of the reasons include his refusal to obey court orders in his case with Audu Maikori, threatening Gloria Ballason who was Maikori's lawyer and a report by Quartz (publication) Africa which named Governor El-rufai as the head of a "powerful" group of Nigerian governors who "now regularly use security agents to arrest and intimidate journalists who dare to question their actions or attempt to hold them accountable".

El Rufai grant pardon to 12 prisoners in Kaduna State, 10 of whom were nearing the end of their sentences, some of the pardons were also granted due to age. Additionally he reduced one prisoners death sentence to life in prison.

Human Rights Concerns
In December 2021, a human rights watchdog group published a report alleging that El-Rufai has punished protestors in Kaduna State. The report details two incidents in which El-Rufai responded to protests by putting the protesting community under house arrest. The first of these lockdown orders was in December 2016 in Jema'a Local Government area and the second stretched 72 days starting in June 2020.

The report says that eleven villagers were killed in the 2016 lockdown. The report lists a number of attacks that happened during the 2020 lockdown and alleges that a total of about 120 villagers were killed at that time. The report also states that El-Rufai has punished protestors with these lockdown orders at least six times since the first incident in 2016 and goes on to document El-Rufai's large wealth as evidenced by his and his family's wide international travels, extravagant lifestyle, and the fact that he sends one of his sons to a private boarding school in Canada where tuition runs about $44,000 USD per year. The report concludes by calling for international governments to sanction El-Rufai for his actions.

These reports add to concerns by human rights organizations that El-Rufai may not respect the human rights of the people in Kaduna state. In October 2021 he resurrected the Religious Preaching Edict of 1984 to create the Interfaith Preaching Regulatory Council. This state body has the authority to approve or deny religious leaders the right to lead and can disapprove the content of their sermons and messages. “Anyone who… begins to preach without authorization, will be liable to pay a fine and may even be imprisoned,” El-Rufai said in a radio interview after imposing the new regulation.

According to one human rights watchdog group, "El-Rufai is pitching this as a measure to reduce religiously fueled violence, [but] he himself has a troubling history of fueling religious tension." The watchdog group then cites how El-Rufai claimed, in a tweet posted on September 8, 2014, that Christians were behind Boko Haram, funding and controlling it to tarnish the name of Islam. Boko Haram is not funded by Christians but is an Islamist terror group with strong ties to Islamic State.

In 2012, El-Rufai threatened anyone who might challenge the Fulani, an ethnic group, even in the line of military duty. “We will write this for all to read. Anyone, soldier or not that kills the Fulani takes a loan payable one day no matter how long it takes,” he tweeted.

In 2019, El-Rufai said, in reference to a conspiracy theory that election observers were meddling in the Nigerian election, that "the person who will come and intervene...will go back in body bags because nobody will come to Nigeria and tell us how to run our country"

Award
In October 2022, a Nigerian national honour of Commander of the Order of the Niger (CON) was conferred on him by President Muhammadu Buhari.

See also
List of Governors of Kaduna State

References

External links
This Day (Lagos) on el-Rufai, 20 August 2005
BBC on Nasir el-Rufai, 7 September 2004,
Nigeria Top Politics, /Facts on our politicians

1960 births
Living people
Alumni of the University of London
Ministers of the Federal Capital Territory (Nigeria)
Harvard Kennedy School staff
Ahmadu Bello University alumni
Peoples Democratic Party (Nigeria) politicians
Federal ministers of Nigeria
Harvard Kennedy School alumni
All Progressives Congress politicians
Barewa College alumni
Governors of Kaduna State
Georgetown University alumni
Politicians from Kaduna State
Candidates in the 2015 Nigerian general election
Quantity surveyors
Mason Fellows